The 2012 Florida Gators football team represented the University of Florida in the sport of American football during the 2012 college football season.  The Gators competed in the Football Bowl Subdivision (FBS) of the National Collegiate Athletic Association (NCAA) and the Eastern Division of the Southeastern Conference (SEC), and played their home games at Ben Hill Griffin Stadium on the university's Gainesville, Florida campus.  The 2012 season was the Gators' second under head coach Will Muschamp. They finished the season with 11–2 overall, 7–1 SEC. The team was invited to the 2013 Sugar Bowl, where they lost to the Louisville Cardinals, 33–23.

Previous season
The 2011 Florida Gators compiled a 7–6 overall win–loss record, and a 3–5 record in the Southeastern Conference.  They concluded the 2011 season with a victory over the Ohio State Buckeyes in the Gator Bowl.

Schedule
The 2012 Orange and Blue Debut game was played on April 7 at 1 p.m. and was televised on Sun Sports.  Blue defeated Orange 21–20 in front of 38,100 fans.

The October 20 game against South Carolina hosted ESPN's College Gameday. In addition, their road games against Texas A&M and Tennessee were also hosted by College GameDay.

Source:

Rankings

Roster

Coaching staff
 Wide receivers coach Aubrey Hill resigned during the offseason, so Pease and graduate assistant Bush Hamdan coached wide receivers.

Recruiting class

Season summary

Bowling Green

Texas A&M

Tennessee

Kentucky

LSU

Vanderbilt

South Carolina

Georgia

Missouri

Louisiana-Lafayette

Jacksonville State

Florida State

Sugar Bowl

Players drafted into the NFL

References

Florida
Florida Gators football seasons
Florida Gators football